The 2016 World Long Distance Mountain Running Championships (or 2016 World Long Distance MR Championships), was the 13th edition of the global Mountain running competition, World Long Distance Mountain Running Championships, organised by the World Mountain Running Association and was held in Podbrdo, Slovenia on 18 June 2016.

Results

Men individual

Men team

Women individual

Women team

References

External links
 World Mountain Running Association official web site

World Long Distance Mountain Running Championships
World Long Distance Mountain Running
2016 in Slovenian sport
June 2016 sports events in Europe